László Budinszky (24 October 1895 – 9 March 1946) was a Hungarian politician, who served as Minister of Justice between 1944 and 1945. He prepared the proposal about the formation of the Leader of the Nation position. He also ordered that the political convicts should be handed over to the Nazi authorities. After the fall of Budapest he tried to escape into Western Europe but the arrival American troops captured him with other members of the Arrow Cross Party's government. He was tried by the People's Tribunal in Budapest in open sessions and sentenced to death for war crimes and high treason. Budinszky was hanged in 1946 in Budapest.

References
 Magyar Életrajzi Lexikon

1895 births
1946 deaths
Politicians from Budapest
People from the Kingdom of Hungary
Arrow Cross Party politicians
Justice ministers of Hungary
Members of the National Assembly of Hungary (1939–1944)
Hungarian people convicted of war crimes
Executed Hungarian collaborators with Nazi Germany
People executed by Hungary by hanging
People executed for war crimes